The Dixie-Jumbo Fires are a complex of wildfires burning in Idaho. The fires started near Riggins, Idaho on July 5, 2021. It has so far burned  and is 12% contained.

Events

July 
The Dixie-Jumbo Fires were first reported on July 5, 2021, at around 12:45 pm MDT.

Cause 
The cause of both fires is believed to be due to lightning.

Containment 
As of August 5, the fire is 12% percent contained.

Impact

Closures and evacuations

See also 
 List of Idaho wildfires

References 

2021 wildfires in the United States
July 2021 events in the United States
August 2021 events in the United States
Wildfires in Idaho